Thai curry is a dish in Thai cuisine made from curry paste, coconut milk or water, meat, seafood, vegetables or fruit, and herbs. Curries in Thailand mainly differ from the curries in India in their use of ingredients such as herbs and aromatic leaves over a mix of spices.

Definition

The first Thai dictionary from 1873 CE (2416 in the Thai Buddhist calendar) defines kaeng as a watery dish to be eaten with rice and utilizing shrimp paste, onions or shallots, chillies, and garlic as essential ingredients. Curries in Lanna (northern Thai) cuisine, with only a few exceptions, do not use coconut milk due to coconut palms not growing well, if at all, in the climate of the Thai highlands. The spiciness of Thai curries depends on the amount and kind of chilli used in the making of the paste. Even within one type of curry the spiciness can differ widely.

The word "curry" figures in the Thai language as "kari", and refers to dishes using either an Indian-style curry powder, known as phong kari in Thailand, or to the dish called kaeng kari, an Indian-influenced curry that is made with spices that are common to Indian dishes but less often used in these proportions in Thai cuisine. Kung phat phong kari (prawns fried with egg and curry powder) is an example of a dish using the Indian style curry powder.

Although  is also defined as being of "watery" substance, the thickness of the sauce can vary considerably from broth-like to that of a thick stew, and it can even be a completely dry dish.

The dish called  is an exception to the rule that a  should contain chillies, garlic, onions and shrimp paste. It is a clear Chinese style meat and/or vegetable broth with mixed vegetables and often also minced pork, tofu and glass noodles. The name translates as "bland curry" but it is seen as being a tom, a soup, and it is therefore also often called tom chuet.

Certain curries can also be eaten with roti, the Thai version of the Indian-style fried flat bread from Malaysia called .

Their popularity in Bangkok as a place for a quick lunchtime meal is in decline.

Typical ingredients

Curry paste

Thai curries are always made with a curry paste. Common ingredients used in many Thai curry pastes are:
Shrimp paste
Chillies; depending on the curry these can be dried or fresh, red or green
Onions or shallots
Garlic
Lemongrass
Galangal
Coriander (cilantro) root

Depending on the type of curry, additional ingredients for the paste can include spices such as turmeric, pepper, coriander seeds, cardamom pods, and cumin, or other ingredients such as boiled fermented fish, and fingerroot.
Ingredients are traditionally ground together with a mortar and pestle, though increasingly with an electric food processor. With many curries, the paste is first stir-fried in cooking oil before other components are added in to the dish. This allows certain flavours in the spices and other ingredients in the paste to develop that cannot be released at the lower temperature of boiling water.

Both khrueang kaeng and nam phrik kaeng are used to describe "curry paste" in Thailand. The latter is sometimes even shortened to only phrik kaeng.

Thai curry pastes can be made at home from the bare ingredients, bought freshly made at markets in Thailand, or they can be had packaged at shops and supermarkets.

Main ingredients
Most Thai curries are made with meat, fish or shellfish as their main ingredient. Vegetables and fruit, but also certain tree leaves such as from the Acacia pennata (cha-om) and the Ficus virens (phak lueat), and flowers such as those of the Sesbania grandiflora (dok khae) and banana (hua pli), can be added. Curries that contain mainly vegetables are, for example, kaeng liang (mixed vegetables) and kaeng nomai (bamboo shoots). Ingredients were dictated by regional and seasonal availability: both pork and chicken (possibly first domesticated from wild jungle fowl in what is now Thailand) are easily available, and so are many varieties of fish, and shellfish, both fresh water species from the many rivers, lakes and rice paddies, as well as salt water species from the Andaman Sea and the Gulf of Thailand. Other traditional ingredients in Thai curries include frogs, snakes, snails, wild birds and game such as Sambar deer and wild boar. Commonly used vegetables in curries are Thai eggplant (makhuea pro), yardlong beans (thua fak yao), and different types of squash and pumpkins (fak).

Additional ingredients
Fresh kaffir lime leaves (bai makrut), fingerroot (krachai), or fresh herbs such as Thai basil (horapa) are often added to Thai curries. Kaffir lime leaves and krachai are often cooked along with the other ingredients but fresh herbs such as Thai basil are nearly always added at the last moment to preserve the full taste and serve as a contrasting note to the flavours of a curry. Fish sauce is not only used when cooking the curry as a flavouring and for its salty taste, but it is usually also available at the table as a condiment, mixed together with sliced green bird's-eye chillies for those that prefer their curries more salty and spicy. Sugar (traditionally palm sugar) is used with curries that need to be sweetened. Besides lime juice, tamarind juice can also see use in sour curries as the souring agent such as in kaeng som. To achieve the most fragrance from the ingredients in a curry paste, the curry paste is often first fried together with vegetable oil or coconut oil that has separated from the coconut cream, before adding in the other ingredients.

Popular Thai curries

 (it is known as "yellow curry" in the West)
, a curry of northern Thai cuisine
 (it is known as "green curry" in the West)
 (in addition to the curry paste, it uses whatever is available in nature)
 (it is known as "red curry" in the West)
 (every region has its own variety)
 (the name  is supposedly derived from "mosalman", an archaic word for "Muslim")
Kaeng Ranjuan (a leftover food with spicy, sour, sweet, and salty beef curry seasoned with no more than fermented shrimp paste chili sauce.)
 (a Burmese-influenced curry noodle soup from northern Thailand)
 (the name possibly refers to the Malaysian island state of Penang; this is a creamy and generally mild curry)
 (this Thai curry actually does not contain ginger)

Gallery

See also

 Curries in List of Thai dishes Kroeung Gulai''

Sources and references

Further reading
 Vatcharin Bhumichitr: The Big Book of Thai Curries

External links

 Templeofthai.com: About Thai curry
 highheelgourmet.com: Thai curry paste and ingredients that don't belong in them